Ernest Frederick 'Ernie' Lapham (1901-2000) was an Australian rugby league footballer who played in the 1920s.

Playing career
Known as 'Curly', Lapham was born in Sydney on 2 July 1901. Lapham was a St. George junior from Hurstville, New South Wales who became a foundation player with St. George, He played in the club's first ever match against Glebe on 23 April 1921. 

Lapham stayed at the St. George club for four seasons between 1921-1924, and then moved to South Sydney during their golden era of 1925-1928.  He played 11 games for Souths in the 1925 season as they went undefeated and won the premiership without the need to contest a grand final.  Despite being at Souths until the end of 1928, Lapham was not included in the grand final sides of 1926, 1927 and 1928.  

He then returned to St. George for his final season in 1929. 

Lapham also represented New South Wales on eight occasions between 1926-1928.

Death
Lapham was regarded as the last surviving member of St. George's foundation team when he died in 2000.  Lapham died on 19 September 2000, in his 100th year at Redcliffe, Queensland.

References

St. George Dragons players
South Sydney Rabbitohs players
New South Wales rugby league team players
City New South Wales rugby league team players
1901 births
2000 deaths
Rugby league second-rows
Rugby league locks
Rugby league players from Sydney